Salipaludibacillus agaradhaerens is a facultative anaerobe bacterium. It is a gram positive, alkaliphilic and alkalitolerant, aerobic endospore-forming bacteria.

In 2019, it was found in a hyperalkaline spring in Zambales (Philippines) a bacterial consortium of a strain of Bacillus  agaradhaerens with Bacillus pseudofirmus that can biodegrade LDPE plastic.

See also
 Organisms breaking down plastic

References

External links
UniProt entry
SCOP Berkley entry
Type strain of Bacillus agaradhaerens at BacDive -  the Bacterial Diversity Metadatabase

Bacteria described in 1995
Organisms breaking down plastic